Thomas Holcroft was an English dramatist.

Thomas Holcroft may also refer to:

Thomas Holcroft (died 1591), Member of Parliament (MP) for Midhurst
Thomas Holcroft (politician) (1505–1558), English courtier, soldier, politician and landowner
Thomas Holcroft (the younger) (died 1620), MP for Cheshire

See also
Holcroft (surname)